Leo A. Temmey (November 6, 1894 – April 22, 1975) was an American attorney and 15th attorney general of South Dakota between 1939 and 1943. He was born in Onida, South Dakota.

Career
Temmey was a Republican.

Temmey graduated from the University of Minnesota School of Law.

1938 attorney general election

On June 27, 1938, Temmey won the Republican nomination on the first ballot, defeating Charles H. McCay of Salem by a margin of 79,510 to 72,718 votes.

Temmey was elected attorney general by defeating incumbent Democrat attorney general Clair Roddewig by a margin of 144,125 to 123,671 votes.

1940 attorney general election

Temmey was re-elected attorney general by defeating Democrat Andrew Foley by a margin of 170,269 to 122,173 votes.

1942 gubernatorial election

Temmey ran for governor in 1942, but he was defeated.

References

University of Minnesota Law School alumni
South Dakota Attorneys General
South Dakota lawyers
South Dakota Republicans
1894 births
1975 deaths
20th-century American lawyers
People from Sully County, South Dakota